Gnaphalium palustre, known by the common name western marsh cudweed, is a species of flowering plant in the family Asteraceae.

The plant is native to much of western North America, where it is common in many habitats and from valley floor to mountain alpine elevations of Western Canada, the Western United States, and Northwestern Mexico. It is found from British Columbia, Alberta, and Saskatchewan south as far as Baja California Sur, Arizona, and New Mexico.

Description
Gnaphalium palustre is an annual herb growing erect stems which may be short or up to about 30 centimeters (12 inches) tall. The stems and foliage are nearly white due to their coating of woolly hairs. The leaves are small and lance-shaped to scoop-shaped.

The inflorescence holds a cluster of flower heads in a nest of woolly fibers. Each head has brownish to pale yellowish phyllaries surrounding a center of many tiny flowers.

References

External links
Jepson Manual Treatment: Gnaphalium palustre
United States Department of Agriculture Plants Profile
Gnaphalium palustre — Calphotos Photo gallery, University of California

palustre
Flora of North America
Plants described in 1841